Madah Kelana (or in English is Kelana hymn) is a collection of poems from the Indonesian poet Sanusi Pane. This collection of poems was published in 1931 and is his second poem book. These poems tells the story of a wanderer who seek happiness and finally found what he was looking for it in itself. Sanusi Pane made this Madah Kelana after touring India since 1929 to 1930. The characteristic of this poems are romantic and we can see many poems on the theme of love.

References 

Poetry collections
Indonesian poetry